Valeria Volodymyrivna Ivanenko is the "Slavonic Channel International" Director General.

Early life and education 
Born in Ust' Khakchan, Magadanskaya Oblast', Russia.
In 1990 graduated from Leningrad Institute of Theatre, Music and Cinema. Majored in television direction.

Employment 
1988 - 1991 – author of the concept and the developer of the broadcasting of the first non-governmental television company on the territory of USSR – TONIS (Mykolaiv, Ukrainian Soviet Socialist Republic).

1991 – 1995 – one of the founders and Director General of the first non-governmental television channel in Kyiv. TONIS's central office had been moved from Nikolaev to the capital of Ukraine, and the company obtained the name of "Tet-a-Tet" (TONIS-Enter-Television).

1994 – 1995 – concept formulation of the Slavonic Channel International project and the organization of experimental broadcasting from an Eutelsat satellite.

«It was a breakthrough in satellite broadcasting on the former USSR's territory. The broadcasting covered the territory with the total population of 550 millions people» (I. Mashenko, «Television de facto»).

1995 – 2003 – Producer General of TONIS; arrangement of the channel's broadcasting.

1997 - 1998 – Producer General of the telecompany "Lybid" (founded by the National Space Agency of Ukraine); head of the project on exclusive media coverage of the first spaceflight mission involving an astronaut from independent Ukraine – Leonid Kadenyuk.

Administrative and creative work at Johnson Space Center and Kennedy Space Center.

1998 - professional training at NBC and CNN.

November 19, 1998 – arranging and conducting the live television broadcast of the STS-87 launch. It was the first live broadcast in the history of one of the leading Ukrainian television channels (Inter).

1993 - 1995 – author of the concept and creative leader of the international festival of television programs "Barkhatny Sezon" (The Velvet Season).

1995 - 2003 – President of the "Barkhatny Sezon".

2003 - Vice-president of the "Garant Media International" agency.

2005 – author of the renewed concept of the Slavonic Channel International broadcasting.
Since 2006 – Director General of the Slavonic Channel International.

Since September 12, 2008 Slavonic Channel International performs twenty-four-hour broadcasting on the territory of Europe.

Awards/Prizes 
 1988 - second prize of the television programs festival for young people in Uzhgorod, Ukraine for the film “Vstrechi” (Meetings) – screenwriter and director.
 1990 - second prize of the international television festival “Ekran” in Budapest, Hungary for the film “Chto nam stoit dom postroit?” (What's it worth to build a house?) – screenwriter.
 1991 - first prize of the international festival in Varna, Bulgaria for the film “Na poroge moei zemli” (On the edge of my land) - screenwriter and director.
 2000 - the award of Ukraine's National Union of Journalists, Zolotoie Pero (Golden Quill).
 2001 - membership in the Eurasian Television Academy.
 2001 - the award of Ukraine's National Union of Journalists, Zolotoie Pero.
 2002 - membership in the International Academy of Television and Radio Broadcasting.
 2002 - the Prometheus Prestige award of the program «Person of the Year» in the nomination “Cultural project of the year” for the project "Barkhatny Sezon".
 2003 - laureate of the “Saint Sophia” honorary award (within the international program “Leaders of the 21st century") for the personal contribution in the revival of spirituality, national science and culture.

External links 
 Biography on official website of SCI

Living people
1966 births
Ukrainian television people
People from Mykolaiv